Julius Real (May 7, 1860 – May 29, 1944) was an American politician from Texas who served as a Republican member of the Texas Senate.

Biographical sketch
Julius Real was born near Kerrville, Texas, on May 7, 1860, on a ranch along Turtle Creek to parents Caspar and Emelie (Schreiner) Real. He was elected to the Texas Senate in 1908 to succeed Robert B. Green in the 24th district. For portions of his time in the Senate, he was its only Republican member. He served until 1915. He was elected again a decade later and served until 1929. Real died on May 29, 1944.

References

1860 births
1944 deaths
Texas Republicans
People from Kerr County, Texas